DSEAR, the Dangerous Substances and Explosive Atmospheres Regulations, 2002, is the United Kingdom's implementation of the European Union-wide ATEX directive.

The intention of the Regulations is to reduce the risk of a fatality or serious injury resulting from a "dangerous substance" igniting and potentially exploding. Examples of a "dangerous substance", as defined by DSEAR, include sawdust, ethanol vapours, and hydrogen gas. The regulation is enforceable by the HSE or local authorities.

From June 2015, DSEAR incorporated changes in the EU Chemical Agents Directive and now also covers gases under pressure and substances that are corrosive to metals.

See also
Health and safety regulations in the United Kingdom
Area classification
Electrical Equipment in Hazardous Areas
Equipment and protective systems intended for use in potentially explosive atmospheres
Intrinsic safety
HSEQ

References

External links
Information on DSEAR risk assessment & compliance
DSEAR legislation
DSEAR Risk Assessments
Inglewood Engineering - Hazardous Area Legislation Introduction
UK HSE DSEAR page

Chemical industry in the United Kingdom
Electrical safety in the United Kingdom
Explosion protection
Health and safety in the United Kingdom
Natural gas safety
Regulation of chemicals in the United Kingdom
Safety codes
Statutory Instruments of the United Kingdom